The Hellisheiði Power Station is the eighth-largest geothermal power station in the world and largest in Iceland. The facility is located in Hengill, southwest Iceland,  from the Nesjavellir Geothermal Power Station. The power station is owned and operated by ON Power, a subsidiary of Reykjavík Energy.

History 

Electricity production with two  turbines commenced in 2006. In 2008, two  turbines were added with steam from Skarðsmýrarfjall Mountain. The hot water plant was introduced in 2010 and the last two high pressure 45 MW turbines were added in 2011.
In order to reduce hydrogen sulphide pollution in the capital area a system was added to the plant in 2014 which reinjects non-condensable gases into the ground.

Renewed drilling
In 2016 the operator, ON, announced a program of new drilling to deal with falling steam levels which had first become apparent in 2013. The program was expected in 2017 to cost 19 billion Icelandic crowns to maintain a steady electric output.

Features

The power plant offers educational tours and presentations about sustainable energy as part of its Geothermal Energy Exhibition.

A pilot direct air capture facility operated by Climeworks is co-located at this site. It was partially funded by the European Union's Horizon 2020 program, and captures up to 4000 metric tons of carbon dioxide each year. The carbon dioxide is captured, injected into the ground, and mineralized.

See also 

 Geothermal power in Iceland
 List of largest power stations in the world
 List of power stations in Iceland
 Renewable energy in Iceland
 CarbFix

References

External links 
 
 Hellisheiði Power Plant 2006-10-21 - Picture gallery from islandsmyndir.is
 Hellisheiði Power Plant 2008-11-15 - Picture gallery from islandsmyndir.is
 Hellisheiði Power Plant 2009-10-04 - Picture gallery from islandsmyndir.is
 Hellisheiði Power Plant, Inside 2012-04-27 - Picture gallery from islandsmyndir.is
 Hellisheiði Power Plant, Outside 2012-05-09 - Picture gallery from islandsmyndir.is

Geothermal power stations in Iceland